Raul Bopp (born in Santa Maria (RS)  on August 4, 1898; died in Rio de Janeiro on June 2, 1984) was a Brazilian poet and diplomat. He did diplomatic work in Japan and was a friend of Oswald de Andrade. Hence his  Cobra Norato is an example of work based in the Manifesto Antropófago. In 1977 he won the Prêmio Machado de Assis.

References

External links 
The first five parts of Bopp's Cobra Norato in a translation by Jennifer Sarah Cooper on Jacket2.org
 Raul Bopp recorded at the Library of Congress for the Hispanic Division's audio literary archive on May 25, 1975

Brazilian diplomats
Brazilian male poets
1898 births
1984 deaths
20th-century Brazilian poets
20th-century Brazilian male writers